James or Jim Caldwell may refer to:

Politics
 James Caldwell (Ohio politician) (1770–1838), U.S. Representative from Ohio, son on James Caldwell (1724–1804), an Irish emigrant who founded Wheeling, West Virginia
 James Caldwell (Missouri speaker) (1763–1840), first Speaker of the Missouri House of Representatives
 Jim Caldwell (Arkansas politician) (born 1936), former member of the Arkansas State Senate
 Buddy Caldwell (James David Caldwell, Jr., born 1946), American politician and attorney from Louisiana
 James Caldwell (British politician) (1839–1925), Member of Parliament for Glasgow St. Rollox, 1886–1892, and Mid Lanarkshire, 1894–1910
 James Eber Caldwell (born 1943), member of the Canadian House of Commons

Sports
 Jim Caldwell (American football) (born 1955), former head coach of the Detroit Lions
 Jim Caldwell (basketball) (born 1943), American basketball player
 Jim Caldwell (footballer) (1888–1929), Australian rules footballer
 Jimmy Caldwell (footballer) (1884–?), Scottish footballer

Other
 James Caldwell (clergyman) (1734–1781), Presbyterian "soldier parson" in the American Revolutionary War
 James Caldwell (Latter Day Saints), dissenting apostle from the Church of Jesus Christ (Bickertonite) who formed the Primitive Church of Jesus Christ
 James Caldwell (died 1770), one of five American colonists killed in the Boston Massacre
James H. Caldwell (1793–1863), American actor and theatre manager
 James Emmot Caldwell (1813–1881), American jeweler
 James Erwin Caldwell (1854–1944), American businessman and banker from Tennessee
 James F. Caldwell Jr. (born 1959), admiral in the United States Navy
 James R. Caldwell (1778–1804), United States Navy officer
 James Caldwell (mathematician) (born 1943), British mathematician
 Sir James Caldwell, 1st Baronet (by 1634–c. 1717), of the Caldwell baronets
 Sir James Caldwell, 4th Baronet (c. 1722–1784), of the Caldwell baronets
 Jim Caldwell, game show host who emceed Tic-Tac-Dough, 1985–1986, and Top Card, 1989–1993
 James Alexander Malcolm Caldwell (1931–1978), British Marxist writer

See also
James Caldwell High School, New Jersey, U.S.
Caldwell (disambiguation)